Defending champion William Larned won the Challenge Round against Beals Wright 6–1, 6–2, 8–6 to capture the men's singles tennis title at the 1908 U.S. National Championships. Wright had defeated Fred Alexander in the All Comers' Final.

The event was held at the Newport Casino in Newport, R.I. in the United States.

Challenge round

All Comers' finals

References

Men's Singles
1908